Schleiz is a town in the district of Saale-Orla-Kreis in Thuringia, Germany. The former municipality Crispendorf was merged into Schleiz in January 2019, and Burgk in December 2019.

Location 
Schleiz is in the Thuringian Vogtland area, an area of wooded hills on the borders of Thuringia, Saxony, Bavaria and the Czech Republic. The city is located in a valley with the river Wisenta near the motorway A 9 (Berlin – München).

Neighboring parishes 

Distances calculated as between town centers.

Subdivisions
Schleiz includes the following subdivisions:
 Möschlitz
 Grochwitz
 Oberböhmsdorf
 Lössau
 Langenbuch
 Wüstendittersdorf
 Dröswein
 Gräfenwarth
 Oschitz
 Heinrichsruh
 Crispendorf
 Burgk

History 
Schleiz can be traced back to a settlement established about 1200 ("Altstadt") and a separate "Neustadt" that was established next to it. The "Neustadt" had a castle and a city wall.  Until 2 December 1482 they were totally separate communities after which they combined to one city. There was a settlement of the Teutonic Order here, and for some years previous to 1848 the town was the capital of the small principality of Reuss-Schleiz. In the vicinity a battle was fought, between the French and the Prussians on 9 October 1806.

Within the German Empire (1871-1918), Schleiz was part of the Principality of Reuss-Gera.

20th Century 

During World War II hundreds of women and men from several nations, including the Soviet Union were transported to Schleiz as forced laborers. At least 60 of them died there.

The palace was destroyed April 1945.

Population 
Trend of population figures:

Recreation 
Schleiz is also the site of the Schleizer Triangle motor racing track.

Notable people

 Johann Friedrich Böttger (1682–1719), alchemist and co-inventor of European porcelain
Heinrich Gottfried Piegler (1797–1849), probably the largest manufacturer of Döbereiner's lamps  
Richard Barthold (1855-1932), US-american politician  
Kurt Holzschuher (1873-1945), owner of the oldest factory in Schleiz (Gebr. Holzschuher) and German politician (DVP)  
Theodor Piegler (1904-1991), great-grandson of H.G. Piegler, co-owner of the internationally active metal goods factory for hairdressing articles "Gebr. Piegler" in Nuremberg  
Joachim Blechschmidt (1912-1943), German pilot and fighter ace in World War II
Bernhard Klee (born 1936), conductor
Juergen K. Klimpke (born 1963), mayor of the city of Schleiz from 2012-2018, member of political committees of the city of Schleiz, author ("Schleizer Heimathefte"), founding member and longtime chairman of the "Geschichts- und Heimatverein zu Schleiz e.V." and photographer

References

Attribution

External links 
 http://www.schleiz.de Official web site for Stadt Schleiz. 

Saale-Orla-Kreis
Principality of Reuss-Gera